Nathaniel Dorsky (born 1943 in New York City), is an American experimental filmmaker and film editor who has been making films since 1963. He attended Antioch College in Yellow Springs, Ohio where he developed his interest in filmmaking. He won an Emmy Award for the film Gauguin in Tahiti: Search for Paradise which was directed by Martin Carr in 1967.

Life and career
Dorsky was a visiting instructor at Princeton University in 2008 and he has been the recipient of many awards including a Guggenheim Fellowship 1997 and grants from the National Endowment of the Arts, two from the Rockefeller Foundation, and one from the LEF Foundation, the Foundation for Contemporary Arts Grants to Artists award (2006), and the California Arts Council.  He has presented films at the Museum of Modern Art, the Centre Pompidou, the Tate Modern, the Filmoteca Española, Madrid, the Prague Film Archive, the Vienna Film Museum, the Pacific Film Archive, the Harvard Film Archive, Princeton University, Yale University, and frequently exhibits new work at the New York Film Festival's Views from the Avant-Garde and the Wavelengths program of the Toronto International Film Festival. In spring 2012, Dorsky took actively part in the three-month exposition of  Whitney Biennial. In October 2015, the New York Film Festival honored his work with a thirty four film complete retrospective at Lincoln Center. Manohla Dargis of the New York Times listed this retrospective in second place in her list of the top ten films of 2015.

In his book Devotional Cinema (2003), Dorsky writes of the long-standing link between art and health as well as the transformative potential of watching film. He also writes of the limitations of film when its vision is subservient to a theme or representative of language description, which can describe a world but does not actually see it.

Dorsky's films are available only as 16mm film prints and are distributed by Canyon Cinema in San Francisco and Light Cone in Paris. Prints of stills from his films are available at the Gallery Paule Anglim, San Francisco, and the Peter Blum Gallery, New York City.

Style
"The major part of my work is both silent and paced to be projected at silent speed (18 frames per second). Silence in cinema is undoubtedly an acquired taste, but the delicacy and intimacy it reveals has many rich rewards.
In film, there are two ways of including human beings. One is depicting them. Another is to create a film form which, in itself, has all the qualities of being human: tenderness, observation, fear, curiosity, the sense of stepping into the world, sudden murky disruptions and undercurrents, expansion, pulling back, contraction, relaxation, sublime revelation. In my work, the screen is transformed into a "speaking character", and the images function as pure energy rather than acting as secondary symbol or as a source for information or storytelling. I put shots together to create a revelation of wisdom through delicate surprise. The montage does not lead to verbal understanding, but is actual and present. The narrative is that which takes place between the viewer and the screen. Silence allows these delicate articulations of vision which are simultaneously poetic and sculptural to be fully experienced." - Nathaniel Dorsky 

“The films of Nathaniel Dorsky blend a beauteous celebration of the sensual world with a deep sense of introspection and solitude. They are occasions for reflection and meditation, on light, landscape, time and the motions of consciousness. Their luminous photography emphasizes the elemental frisson between solidity and luminosity, between spirit and matter, while his uniquely developed montage permits a fluid and flowing experience of time. Dorsky's films reveal the mystery behind everyday existence, providing intimations of eternity." - Steve Polta, San Francisco Cinematheque.

Awards
 Emmy Award for the film Gauguin in Tahiti: Search for Paradise 1967

Filmography

Ingreen (1964)
A Fall Trip Home (1964)
Summerwind (1965)
Two Personal Gifts (AKA Fool's Spring) (1966–67) (with Jerome Hiler)
Hours for Jerome Part 1&2 (1966-70/82)
Pneuma (1977–83)
Ariel (1983)
Alaya (1976–87)
17 Reasons Why (1985–87)
Triste (1974–96)
Variations (1992–98)
Arbor Vitae (1999-00)
Love's Refrain (2000–01)
The Visitation (2002)
Threnody (2004)
Song and Solitude (2005–06)
Kodachrome Dailies from the Time of Song and Solitude (Reel 1) (2005-2006)
Kodachrome Dailies from the Time of Song and Solitude (Reel 2) (2005-2006)
Winter (2007)
Sarabande (2008)
Compline (2009)
Aubade (2010)
Pastourelle (2010)
The Return (2011)
August and After (2012)
April (2012)
Song (2013
Spring (2013)
Summer (2013)
December (2014)
February (2014)
Avraham (2014)
Intimations (2015)
Prelude (2015)
Autumn (2016)
The Dreamer (2016)
Lux Perpetua I (2000-2002/2016) Original Kodachrome only
Lux Perpetua II (1999-2002/2016) Original Kodachrome only
Other Archer (2003/2016) Original Kodachrome only
Death of a Poet (2003/2016) Original Kodachrome only
Ossuary (1995-2005/2016) Original Kodachrome only
Arboretum Cycle (2017, 137 min.) comprising the following films:
Elohim (2017)
Abaton (2017)
Coda (2017)
Ode (2017)
September (2017)
Monody (2017)
Epilogue (2017)
Colophon (for the Arboretum Cycle) (2018)
Calyx (2018)
Apricity (2019)
Interlude (2019)
Canticles (2019)
Lamentations (2020)
Temple Sleep (2020)
William (2020)
Emanations (2020)
Ember Days (2021)
Terce (2021)
Interval (2021)
Caracole (for Mac) (2022)
Naos (2022)
Dialogues (2022)
Place d'Or (2023)

References

External links
 "about Nathaniel Dorsky" collected online articles, documents, comments and news, about and by filmmaker Nathaniel Dorsky, Official website
Link to ART FORUM: "Tone Poems" by P. ADAMS SITNEY Article on the films of Nathaniel Dorsky, November 2007, PDF

1943 births
American experimental filmmakers
American male writers
Antioch College alumni
LGBT film directors
LGBT people from New York (state)
Living people
Silent film directors